Gaël Lévecque (born 23 November 1994) is a French male high jumper, who won an individual gold medal at the Youth World Championships.

References

External links

1994 births
Living people
French male high jumpers
21st-century French people